Cormac na Haoine MacCarthy Reagh, 13th Prince of Carbery (1490–1567) was an Irish chieftain who owned almost half a million acres in south west Ireland.

Birth and origins 
Cormac was born in Carbery about 1490, the eldest son of Donal MacCarthy Reagh and his second wife Eleanor FitzGerald. His father was the 12th Prince of Carbery. His father's family were the MacCarthy Reagh, a Gaelic Irish dynasty that branched from the MacCarthy-Mor line with Donal Gott MacCarthy, a medieval King of Desmond, whose sixth son Donal Maol MacCarthy Reagh was the first independent ruler of Carbery.

His mother was a daughter of Gerald FitzGerald, 8th Earl of Kildare. Her family, the Geraldines, were an Old English.

Battle of Mourne 
The Battle of Mourne or of Mourne Abbey, also called of Cluhar and Moor, was fought in 1520 or 1521. It was part of an internecine strife of the Geraldines of Desmond in which Thomas FitzThomas FitzGerald defeated his nephew James FitzGerald, 10th Earl of Desmond, and succeeded him as the 11th Earl. Carbery was drawn into this as Thomas Fitzthomas was allied with MacCarthy's father-in-law, Cormac Oge Laidir MacCarthy. MacCarthy therefore led his father's troops against the 11th Earl of Desmond, who was defeated.

Prince 
MacCarty succeeded his father in 1530 as the 13th prince of Carbery.

Marriage and children 
MacCarthy married Julia, daughter of Cormac Oge Laidir MacCarthy, 10th Lord of Muskerry. It was his first but her second marriage. She was the widow of Gerald Fitzmaurice, 15th Baron Kerry, who had died in 1550.

Cormac and Julia had two sons:
Donal na Pipi, became the 17th  Prince
 Dermond na-Glac MacCarthy

—and four daughters:
 Catherine, married John Butler of Kilcash, father of Walter Butler, 11th Earl of Ormond
 Honoria, married her distant cousin Owen MacDonogh MacCarthy, Prince of Duhallow
 Ellinor, married her cousin Dermod MacCarthy of Enniskean
 Ellen, married first in 1572 Sir James FitzGerald, Lord of Decies (died 1581), and secondly James FitzRichard de Barry, Lord Ibane and 4th Viscount Buttevant, ancestor of the Earls of Barrymore. Ellen seems to have been an illegitimate child.

After MacCarthy's death his wife would marry thirdly Edmund Butler, 1st/11th Baron Dunboyne (died 1566)

Death 
Carbery, as he now was, died in 1567. He was succeeded according to Brehon law and tanistry by his brother Finghin as the 14th prince.

Ancestry

See also 
http://www.libraryireland.com/Pedigrees1/MacCarthyReaghCarbery.php Irish Pedigrees: MacCarthy Reagh, Prince of Carbery] #120

Notes and references

Notes

Citations

Sources 

 
 
 
  – Dacre to Dysart (for Dunboyne)
  – to 1603
 
  – Earls
  – Irish stem

1490 births
1567 deaths
16th-century Irish people
De Barry family
Irish lords
MacCarthy dynasty
People of Elizabethan Ireland